Naba Ballygunge Mahavidyalaya, formerly known as Charu Chandra Evening College, established in 1985, is an undergraduate college in Kasba, West Bengal, India. It is affiliated with the University of Calcutta.

Departments

commerce 

Bengali
English
History
Political Science
Philosophy
Education
Economics

Accreditation
It is recognized by the University Grants Commission (UGC).

See also 
List of colleges affiliated to the University of Calcutta
Education in India
Education in West Bengal

References

External links
College

Educational institutions established in 1985
University of Calcutta affiliates
Universities and colleges in Kolkata
1985 establishments in West Bengal